Svinița is a commune in Mehedinți County, Romania, located on the Danube (in the area of the Banat known as Clisura Dunării – Banatska Klisura in Serbian). It is composed of a single village, Svinița. In 2011, its population numbered 928 people and was mostly composed of Serbs. It is one of four localities in the county located in the Banat.

Name
The name Svinjica means "the pig place" or "little pig" in Serbian.

History
In the autumn of 1848, the locality was the site of a daring escape of Wallachian revolutionaries kept in Ottoman custody. Maria Rosetti and Constantin Daniel Rosenthal called on the local mayor to demand that Ottoman guards hand in their weapons on what was at the time Austrian soil, and all persons arrested were consequently free to go.

Demographics

Ethnic groups (2011 census): 
 Serbs (90.3%)
 Romanians (6.5%)
 Romani (0.9%)
 Unknown (2.3%)

Languages
The commune is officially bilingual, with both Romanian and Serbian being used as working languages on public signage and in administration, education and justice.

Religion
As of 2011, most of the inhabitants of the commune (90.3%) were Serbian Orthodox by religion, while most of the rest are Romanian Orthodox (6.5%).

Notes

External links 

Communes in Mehedinți County
Serb communities in Romania
Localities in Romanian Banat
Place names of Slavic origin in Romania